Fran Brennan (born 14 February 1940) is an Irish former association football player.

He played for Transport, Drumcondra, Dundalk and Shelbourne at club level, winning the league title with Drumcondra in 1965 and Dundalk in 1967. He later served as manager of Dundalk.

On 24 March 1965, he won his only senior cap for the Republic of Ireland national football team when he lined out in defence in a 2–0 defeat to Belgium in a friendly international played at Dalymount Park.

Fran subsequently was involved in the underage set up assisting Paddy Hilliard with Under 14 International teams.

Fran came from a family of 10, with 4 sisters and 6 brothers. His brother Tom was an Irish Senior Cross Country Champion, winning the title in 1975 and was a significant contributor to the development of the Liffey Valley Athletic Club.

Honours
League of Ireland: 2
 Drumcondra F.C. 1964/65
 Dundalk F.C. 1966/67

References

Association footballers from County Dublin
Republic of Ireland association footballers
Republic of Ireland international footballers
League of Ireland players
Living people
Drumcondra F.C. players
Dundalk F.C. players
Dundalk F.C. managers
League of Ireland managers
1940 births
League of Ireland XI players
Transport F.C. players
Bluebell United F.C. players
Association football defenders
Republic of Ireland football managers